Natural is the fifteenth studio album by Japanese Jazz fusion band T-Square. It was released on April 21, 1990. It was the last to feature Takeshi Itoh on saxophone and EWI, during his initial run with the band (from the formation to 1990). He returned to T-Square in mid-2000 and has been performing with the group ever since.

Track listing
Sources

References

T-Square (band) albums
1990 albums